Raymond Frank McMullen (18 January 1933 – 21 May 2004) was a New Zealand rugby union player and referee. A centre and wing three-quarter, McMullen represented Auckland at a provincial level, and was a member of the New Zealand national side, the All Blacks, from 1957 to 1960. He played 29 matches for the All Blacks including 11 internationals. After retiring as a player in 1960, McMullen became a rugby union referee, reaching international level. His appointments included controlling the 1973 test between the All Blacks and the touring English team.

References

1933 births
2004 deaths
People from Auckland
New Zealand rugby union players
New Zealand international rugby union players
Auckland rugby union players
Rugby union centres
Rugby union wings
New Zealand rugby union referees